The 2003 Red Bull Air Race World Series was the 1st Red Bull Air Race World Series season. It started on June 28, 2003 and ended on August 20.

In the 2003 season, there were two air race venues only, Zeltweg in Austria and Budapest in Hungary.

Six pilots competed in the first leg. Due to a timing dispute, no points were given. In the second and final round, only three pilots participated. Hungarian Péter Besenyei won the race in Budapest and so the 2003 championship with 6 points. Klaus Schrodt from Germany became second before the American pilot Kirby Chambliss.

Race calendar

Standings and results

Legend:
 DNP: Did not participate
 DNS: Did not show
 NC: Not classified

Aircraft

External links
 Details of 2003 Air Races

Red Bull Air Race World Championship seasons
Red Bull Air Race World Series
Red Bull Air Race World Series